The first world record in the women's discus throw was recognized by the International Association of Athletics Federations in 1923. As of 2013, 55 world records have been ratified by the IAAF in the event.

World record progression

See also
Men's discus world record progression

References

Discus, women
Discus*
Discus throw
world record